Dikaya is a rural locality (a station) in Mayskoye Rural Settlement, Vologodsky District, Vologda Oblast, Russia. The population was 274 as of 2002. There are 2 streets.

Geography 
Dikaya is located 28 km west of Vologda (the district's administrative centre) by road. Markovo, Gorka is the nearest locality, Mesha is the nearest creek.

References 

Rural localities in Vologodsky District